Ferriday is a town in Concordia Parish, which borders the Mississippi River and is located on the central eastern border of Louisiana, United States. With a population of 3,511 at the 2010 census, it is an African-American majority town. 

The town claims to have produced more famous people per square mile than any other in America. This statement intrigued author Elaine Dundy, who explored both celebrities and townsfolk in her book, Ferriday, Louisiana, published by E. P. Dutton in 1991.

Churches of several major denominations are located here, including a large Pentecostal congregation south of town on Louisiana Highway 15, as well as Baptist, Assembly of God, Presbyterian, Methodist, and Catholic.

Geography

U.S. Routes 84 and 425 pass through the center of Ferriday. US 84 leads west  to Jonesville, and US 425 leads north  to Clayton. The two highways jointly lead southeast  to Natchez, Mississippi.

Climate
<div style="width:65%">

</div style>

Demographics

2020 census

As of the 2020 United States census, there were 3,189 people, 1,354 households, and 885 families residing in the town.

2000 census
As of the census of 2000, there were 3,723 people, 1,350 households, and 918 families residing in the town. The racial makeup of the town was 74.89% African American, 24.09% White, 0.19% Native American, 0.27% Asian, 0.03% Pacific Islander, 0.19% from other races, and 0.35% from two or more races. Hispanic or Latino of any race were 0.46% of the population.

There were 1,350 households, out of which 34.0% had children under the age of 18 living with them, 30.7% were married couples living together, 33.8% had a female householder with no husband present, and 32.0% were non-families. 29.3% of all households were made up of individuals, and 13.4% had someone living alone who was 65 years of age or older. The average household size was 2.62 and the average family size was 3.27.

In the town, the population was spread out, with 32.0% under the age of 18, 9.6% from 18 to 24, 22.2% from 25 to 44, 18.6% from 45 to 64, and 17.5% who were 65 years of age or older. The median age was 34 years. For every 100 females, there were 76.2 males. For every 100 females age 18 and over, there were 68.2 males.

The median income for a household in the town was $14,732, and the median income for a family was $18,636. Males had a median income of $23,654 versus $16,725 for females. The per capita income for the town was $8,767. About 40.7% of families and 47.4% of the population were below the poverty line, including 70.2% of those under age 18 and 25.1% of those age 65 or over.

In 2010, Ferriday had the 15th-lowest median household income of all places in the United States with a population over 1,000.

Education
The Concordia Parish School Board serves Ferriday. Ferriday High School is located off LA 15. Its sports teams are known as the Trojans. To the right rear of the high school is the Concordia Parish Library.

The Central Louisiana Technical Community College is located in Ferriday.

Notable people
 Andy Anders, politician and farm equipment salesman in Ferriday; former state representative for Concordia Parish 
 Campbell Brown, NBC and CNN news correspondent
 Brenham C. Crothers, (1905-1984), state senator from 1948 to 1952 and 1956 to 1960
 Mickey Gilley (1936-2022), country musician and owner of Gilley's Nightclub in Pasadena, Texas 
 Dale Houston (1940–2007), whose single "I'm Leaving It Up To You" reached No. 1 in 1963
 Jerry Lee Lewis (1935-2022), rock and roll pioneer, pianist
 Howard K. Smith (1914-2002), CBS and ABC commentator and anchorman; Howard K. Smith: News and Comment (1962–1963)
 Jimmy Lee Swaggart, evangelist; he was involved in sex scandals in the late 1980s and early 1990s which were revealed, but he never left his Ministries.

Photo gallery

References

External links

Towns in Concordia Parish, Louisiana
Towns in Louisiana
Towns in Natchez micropolitan area